The siege of Kolding was fought on December 25, 1658, between Sweden and the forces of the Polish–Lithuanian Commonwealth and Denmark–Norway. The Polish and Danish forces were led by Stefan Czarniecki. The Polish-Danish force won the battle.

References

Bibliography 
Leszek Podhorodecki, "Rapier i koncerz: Z dziejów wojen polsko-szwedzkich", Warsaw 1985,

Conflicts in 1658
Battles of the Deluge (history)
Battles involving Denmark
1658 in Denmark
Sieges involving Sweden